1st Army Tank Brigade  may refer to:

 1st Canadian Tank Brigade
 1st Army Tank Brigade (United Kingdom)
 1st Army Tank Brigade (New Zealand) (1941–42, broken up to provide personnel and equipment for the 4th New Zealand Armoured Brigade, New Zealand 2nd Division)